Camila Luna (born 1993) is a Puerto Rican Latin alternative-pop singer-songwriter who was nominated for a Latin Grammy for Best Pop/Rock Album in 2015 for her first album Flamboyán. She was nominated for a Latin Grammy for Best Vocal Pop Contemporary Album in 2017 for her second album Flora y Fauna.

Biography

Background
Camila Luna is a Puerto Rico-born poet and has been living in Miami, Florida, since the age of 3. She is a student and teaching assistant at University of Miami's Master in Fine Arts program at the Miami College of Arts & Sciences.

According to People en Español, Luna wrote her first poem, "The Snowflake",  at the age of five, which was published in a children's poetry magazine. She credits her uncle for teaching her how to play the guitar at age of 15. Her first two albums, Flamboyán (2014) and Flora y Fauna (2017) both earned nominations from the Latin Grammys. Without a budget, she filmed the music video for Flamboyán on her iPhone, in her grandmother's backyard, in Puerto Rico.  The single Siento, from Flora y Fauna, had 3.2 million spins on Spotify as of October 4, 2017.

Discography

Albums 
 Flamboyán (2014)
 Flora y Fauna (2017)

Singles 
 "Mi Soledad y Yo" (2014)
 "Flamboyán" (2014)
 "Siento" (2016)

Awards and Recognitions 
Camila Luna was nominated for a Latin Grammy in 2015 for Best Pop/Rock Album of the Year for her first album Flamboyán.

She was also nominated for a Latin Grammy in 2017 for Best Vocal Pop Contemporary Album of the Year for her second album Flora y Fauna.

References

External links 
 

Puerto Rican singer-songwriters
Living people
21st-century Puerto Rican women singers
1993 births
21st-century American women singers
21st-century American singers
Women in Latin music